The Olympia Columbian, later known as the Washington Pioneer and the Pioneer and Democrat, was the first newspaper in what is now the U.S. state of Washington, and the seventh in the Oregon Territory. It continued under several name variants, going out of print as The Pacific Tribune in 1879.

References

Further reading 
 Pioneer Papers of Puget Sound, Oregon Historical Quarterly, 1903
 The Columbian: Washington Territory's First Newspaper, Oregon Historical Quarterly, 1963

Newspapers established in the 1850s
Newspapers published in Washington (state)